Plano is a city in Collin County and Denton County, Texas. It had a population of 285,494 at the 2020 census. It is a principal city of the Dallas–Fort Worth metroplex.

History

Indigenous peoples around Collin County and North Texas included the Caddo, Comanche, Cherokee, Delaware, Kickapoo, and Tonkawa. European settlers came to the area near present-day Plano in the early 1840s. Facilities such as a sawmill, a gristmill, and a store soon brought more people to the area. A mail service was established, and after rejecting several names for the nascent town (including naming it in honor of then-President Millard Fillmore), residents suggested the name Plano (from the Spanish word for "flat") in reference to the local terrain, unvaried and devoid of any trees. The post office accepted the name.

In 1872, the completion of the Houston and Central Texas Railway helped Plano grow, and it was incorporated in 1873. By 1874, the population was over 500. In 1881, a fire raged through the business district, destroying most of the buildings. Plano was rebuilt and business again flourished through the 1880s. Also in 1881, the city assumed responsibility for what would eventually become Plano Independent School District (PISD), ending the days of it being served only by private schools.

At first, Plano's population grew slowly, reaching 1,304 in 1900 and 3,695 in 1960. By 1970, Plano began to feel some of the boom its neighbors had experienced after World War II. A series of public works projects and a change in taxes that removed the farming community from the town helped increase the population. In 1970, the population reached 17,872, and by 1980, it had exploded to 72,000. Sewers, schools, and street development kept pace with this massive increase, largely because of Plano's flat topography, grid layout, and planning initiatives.

During the 1980s, many large corporations, including J. C. Penney and Frito-Lay, moved their headquarters to Plano, spurring further growth. By 1990, the population reached 128,713, dwarfing the county seat, McKinney. In 1994, Plano was recognized as an All-America City. By 2000, the population grew to 222,030, making it one of Dallas's largest suburbs. Plano is surrounded by other municipalities and so cannot expand in area, and there is little undeveloped land within the city limits. But as of July 2012, one large tract of land was being developed: Turnpike Commons at the intersection of Renner Road and the George Bush Turnpike (also bordered by Shiloh Road to the east). The development is expected to feature apartments, medical facilities, restaurants, a Race Trac gas station, and a hotel.

On June 15, 2015, after five years of disuse, a 178-foot water tower built in 1985 was demolished to make room for Legacy West.

Geography
According to the United States Census Bureau, Plano has an area of 71.6 square miles (185.5 km2).

Plano is in the humid subtropical climate zone. The highest recorded temperature was 118 °F (48 °C) in 1936. On average, the coolest month is January and the warmest is July. The lowest recorded temperature was –7 °F (–22 °C) in 1930. The maximum average precipitation occurs in May.

Demographics

As of the 2020 United States census, there were 285,494 people, 107,320 households, and 76,211 families residing in the city. , Plano had 259,841 people, 99,131 households and 69,464 families, up from 80,875 households and 60,575 families in the 2000 census. The population density was 3,629.1 people per square mile (1,400.8/km2). There were 103,672 housing units at an average density of 1,448.6 per square mile (559.3/km2).

In 2010, the racial makeup of the city was 67% White (58.4% non-Hispanic white), 7.5% Black, 0.36% Native American, 16.9% Asian (6.5% Asian Indian, 5.2% Chinese, 1.2% Vietnamese, 1.2% Korean, 0.6% Filipino, 0.2% Japanese, 1.9% Other), 0.1% Pacific Islander, 3.86% from other races, and 3.0% from two or more races. Hispanic or Latino made up 14.7% of the population (10.6% Mexican, 0.5% Puerto Rican, 0.2% Cuban, 3.5% Other). By 2020, the racial makeup was 46.3% non-Hispanic white, 8.77% Black or African American, 0.3% Native American, 24.08% Asian, 0.05% Pacific Islander, 0.47% some other race, 4.0% multiracial, and 16.04% Hispanic or Latino of any race, reflecting nationwide trends of greater diversification.

Of the 99,131 households in 2010, 35.8% had children under the age of 18. Married couples accounted for 56.7%; 9.7% had a female householder with no husband present, and 29.9% were non-families. About 24.4% of all households were individuals, and 5.3% had someone living alone who was 65 years of age or older. The average household size was 2.61, and the average family size was 3.15. Data indicates that 28.7% of Plano's population was under the age of 18, 7.0% was 18 to 24, 36.5% was 25 to 44, 22.9% was 45 to 64, and 4.9% was 65 years of age or older. The median age was 34. For every 100 females, there were 99.3 males. For every 100 females age 18 and over, there were 97.2 males.

According to a 2007 estimate, the median income for a household in the city was $84,492, and the median income for a family was $101,616. About 3.0% of families and 4.3% of the population were living below the poverty line, including 4.6% of those under age 18 and 7.8% of those 65 or older. In 2007, Plano had the United States' highest median income among cities with a population exceeding 250,000, at $84,492. As of 2010, Plano had a median income of $103,913 annually. According to crime statistics, there were four homicides in Plano in 2006, the lowest rate of all U.S. cities of 250,000 or more people.

Plano also has a substantial Iranian-American community.

Foreign-born residents
, of the foreign-born residents, 17% were from China, 9% from India, and 4% from Vietnam; a total of 30% of foreign-born residents came from these three countries. That year, 22% of Plano's foreign-born originated in Mexico.

Chinese Americans 

Along with Houston, Plano has one of Texas's two major concentrations of Chinese Americans. According to the 2010 U.S. census, there were 14,500 ethnic Chinese in Plano. Of cities with 250,000 or more residents, Plano has the sixth-largest percentage of ethnic Chinese, making up 5.2% of the city's population. Charlie Yue, the executive vice president of the Association of Chinese Professionals, estimated that about 30,000 Plano residents are Chinese and that many "don't participate in government activities, like the census".

Chinese professionals began to settle Plano by 1991. As of 2011, DFW's Chinese restaurants catering to ethnic Chinese are mainly in Plano and Richardson. Most of the DFW-area Chinese cultural organizations are headquartered in Plano and Richardson. Plano has six Chinese churches and supermarkets, including 99 Ranch Market and zTao Marketplace.

Economy

Top employers

According to the Plano Economic Development 2017 Leading Employers Report, Plano's top 10 employers were:

About 80% of Plano's visitors are business travelers, due to its close proximity to Dallas and the many corporations headquartered in Plano. The city also has a convention center owned and operated by the city. Plano has made a concerted effort to draw retail to its downtown area and the Legacy West in an effort to boost sales tax returns. It has two malls, The Shops at Willow Bend and The Shops at Legacy. Collin Creek Mall closed in 2019. There is an area that has apartments, shops, and restaurants constructed with the New Urbanism philosophy. An experimental luxury Walmart Supercenter is at Park Boulevard and the Dallas North Tollway.

Headquarters of major corporations
Some of the country's largest and most recognized companies are headquartered in Plano. Legacy Drive in ZIP Code 75024, between Preston Road and Dallas North Tollway, has many corporate campuses. The following companies have corporate headquarters (Fortune 1000 headquarters) or major regional offices in Plano:

 At Home
 Beal Bank
 Cookies by Design
 Cinemark Theatres
 Crossmark
 Denbury Inc.
 Diodes Incorporated
 FedEx Office
 Fogo de Chão
 Frito-Lay
 Hilti North America
  Huawei Device USA JCPenney
 Main Event Entertainment
 NTT Data Services
 Pizza Hut
 Rent-A-Center
 Ribbon Communications
 Robot Entertainment
 Siemens Digital Industries Software
 Toyota Motor North America
 Tyler Technologies
 Zoës Kitchen

In 2014 Toyota Motor North America announced its U.S. headquarters would move from Torrance, California, to Plano. In 2015, Liberty Mutual announced its plans to build a new corporate campus just a few blocks east of Toyota's, bringing an estimated 5,000 jobs to the community. In January 2016, JP Morgan Chase and mortgage giant Fannie Mae announced they would move their regional operations to Plano, bringing a combined 7,000 new jobs to the community.

Arts and culture
The Plano Public Library System (PPLS) consists of the W.O. Haggard, Jr. Library, the Maribelle M. Davis Library, the Gladys Harrington Library, the Christopher A. Parr Library, the L.E.R. Schimelpfenig Library, and the Municipal Reference Library. The Haggard Library houses the system's administrative offices.

The Plano Symphony Orchestra is partially funded by the city, performing regularly at St. Andrew United Methodist Church and the Charles W. Eisemann Center for Performing Arts in nearby Richardson.

Historic sites
 Plano Station, Texas Electric Railway (1908)
 Heritage Farmstead Museum (1891)

Parks and recreation

Although Plano is named for the flat plains of the area, large trees abound in the city's many parks. One such tree, estimated to be over 200 years old, is in Bob Woodruff Park, near Rowlett Creek on the city's east side.

There are two main open space preserves: Arbor Hills Nature Preserve (200 acres) which contains a pond in honor of Vasil Levski and Oak Point Park and Nature Preserve (800 acres). Bob Woodruff Park and Oak Point Park and Nature Preserve are connected by biking trails, making the green space one large uninterrupted park space larger than New York City's Central Park (840 acres). Go Ape, a family-friendly place with outdoor activities like ziplining and Tarzan swings, is at Oak Point Park and Preserve. The Plano Balloon Festival, which happens every September, also takes place at Oak Point Park and Preserve. Another open space is Haggard Park, which hosts the annual Plano AsiaFest in May. Acreage of all spaces the Parks Department manages totals 3,830.81. The Plano Master Plan has the acreage growing to 4,092.63 when complete.

There are five recreation centers: Tom Muehlenbeck Recreation Center, Carpenter Park Recreation Center, Oak Point Recreation Center, Liberty Recreation Center, and Douglass Community Center. Carpenter Park Recreation Center, Oak Point Recreation Center, and Tom Muehlenbeck Recreation Center have an indoor pool, while Liberty Recreation Center has an outdoor pool. Plano Senior Recreation Center is a recreation center dedicated to seniors. There are three swimming pools owned by Plano Parks & Recreation: Harry Rowlinson Community Natatorium, Jack Carter Pool, and Plano Aquatic Center. All the pools are indoor except Jack Carter Pool. Douglass Community Center houses the Boys & Girls Club of Collin County. For pet owners, there are The Dog Park at Jack Carter Park, The Dog Park at Bob Woodruff, and Dog Park at Windhaven Meadows Park.

The City of Plano also owns and operates four performing arts venues and a conference center under the auspices of the Parks and Recreation Department: the Courtyard Theater, the Cox Playhouse, the Amphitheater at Oak Point Park, McCall Plaza, and the Oak Point Park Nature and Retreat Center.

Government

Local government

Plano has a council-manager form of government, with a part-time city council that sets city policy and a city manager responsible for city operations. The Plano City Council has eight members elected on a nonpartisan basis in staggered odd-year elections every other May. Council members and the mayor are elected by and serve the city at large. Council members serving in places one, two, three, and four must reside in that district, and the mayor always serves in place six. The mayor receives a yearly stipend of $8,400, and each council member receives $6,000.

All council members, including the mayor, serve a maximum of two consecutive four-year terms. The mayor and city council members could serve for a maximum of three consecutive three-year terms until voters approved changes to the city charter in 2011.

The 38th mayor of Plano was businessman Harry LaRosiliere, who was elected the first African-American mayor of Plano in 2013. Plano elected its first African-American city council member, David Perry, in 1990.

On December 8, 2014, the city council passed an amendment to its civil rights act to include sexual orientation and gender identity as protected. The ordinance drew the ire of conservative groups such as the Liberty Institute, which argued that it infringed on business owners' religious rights. Many civil rights organizations were not supportive either, such as the Human Rights Campaign, which argued that the policy's exclusion of transgender individuals from being able to use bathrooms and locker rooms that align with their gender identity rendered the ordinance not worth defending.

In the 2008 fiscal year Comprehensive Annual Financial Report, Plano reported $194 million in revenue, $212 million in expenditures, $278 million in total assets, $31.4 million in total liabilities, and $337 million in cash and investments.

Plano is a voluntary member of the North Central Texas Council of Governments association, the purpose of which is to coordinate individual and collective local governments and facilitate regional solutions, eliminate unnecessary duplication, and enable joint decisions.

In 2020, Police Chief Ed Drain announced the Plano Police Department would no longer make arrests for possession of small amounts of marijuana.

Politics
Dallas's wealthy northern suburbs were solidly Republican and in 2005, the Bay Area Center for Voting Research ranked Plano, the largest of them, the United States' fifth-most conservative city. It has become more competitive in national elections as its population has diversified, shifting toward the Democratic Party since 2016, when Donald Trump won the city by a narrow margin. In 2018, Beto O'Rourke became the first Democrat to win the city in a statewide election in the 21st century, and in 2020, Joe Biden won the city by an even larger margin. But in local and state elections, Plano still leans Republican, voting to reelect Governor Greg Abbott in 2018 and narrowly reelecting Republicans to the Texas House of Representatives and Texas Senate in 2018 and 2020.

State representation
Plano is split between the 33rd, 65th, 66th, 67th, 70th, and 89th Districts in the Texas House of Representatives. The part of Plano in Collin County is wholly contained in Senate District 8, while the Denton County portion is in District 30.

Republican Matt Shaheen represents Texas House District 66, Republican Jeff Leach has represented Texas House District 67 since 2013, and Democrat Mihaela Plesa represents Texas House District 70. Republican Angela Paxton represents Texas Senate District 8.

Federal representation
Plano is split between Texas' 3rd, 4th, 26th, and 32nd congressional districts, represented by Republicans Keith Self, Pat Fallon, and Michael Burgess, and Democrat Collin Allred respectively. Plano is represented in the United States Senate by Republicans Ted Cruz and John Cornyn.

Education
Plano has 70 public schools, 16 private schools, and two campuses of the Collin County Community College District (Collin College).

Primary and secondary schools

The Plano Independent School District serves most of the city. Student enrollment has increased dramatically over the past few decades. Plano has a unique high school system, in which grades 9–10 attend a high school and grades 11–12 attend a senior high. There are three senior high schools (grades 11–12) in PISD: Plano East, Plano, and Plano West. Small portions of Plano are served by the Lewisville Independent School District, Frisco Independent School District, and Allen Independent School District.

Plano schools graduate more of their students than comparable districts. In 2010, 93% of Plano Independent Student District students graduated from high school, 18 percentage points higher than Dallas ISD's rate. In 2012, Plano Independent School District announced that 128 seniors were selected as National Merit Semifinalists.

Plano has given $1.2 billion in property tax revenue to other school districts through Texas's "Robin Hood" law, which requires school districts designated as affluent to give a percentage of their property tax revenue to other districts outside the county. In 2008, PISD gave $86 million. Controversy erupted when the salaries of teachers in less affluent districts—such as Garland ISD—exceeded the salaries of teachers in districts that had to pay into "Robin Hood".

In the 2013–14 school year, Plano ISD opened two four-year high school academies, one focusing on STEAM (STEM education plus Media Arts) called Plano ISD Academy High School, and the other on health science. Additionally, the district modified its International Baccalaureate program to allow freshmen and sophomores in the program to be housed at Plano East Senior High School.

In addition to Catholic primary and middle schools, the Roman Catholic Diocese of Dallas operates John Paul II High School in Plano. Non-Catholic private schools in Plano include Great Lakes Academy, Spring Creek Academy, Yorktown Education, and Prestonwood Christian Academy. In addition, the Collin County campus of Coram Deo Academy is in the One Church (previously Four Corners Church) facility in Plano.

Colleges and universities

Plano is the home to two campuses of Collin College, one at the Courtyard Center on Preston Park Boulevard and the larger Spring Creek Campus on Spring Creek Parkway at Jupiter. DBU North, a satellite campus of Dallas Baptist University, is in west Plano, and offers undergraduate and graduate courses and houses the admissions and academic counseling offices.

As defined by the Texas Legislature, all of Collin County is in the Collin College district. The portion of Plano within Denton County is zoned to North Central Texas College.

Infrastructure
Transportation

Plano is one of 12 suburbs of Dallas that opt into the Dallas Area Rapid Transit (DART) public transportation system. During its early membership in DART, Plano was lightly served by bus lines, but in 2002, the Red Line of the DART Light Rail project opened stations in Downtown Plano and at Parker Road, which provide access to commuters traveling to work elsewhere in the Dallas area. The Orange Line traverses the same route for selected weekday/peak hour trips. The Silver Line is also planned to run through Southern Plano. Approximately 1% of the city's population uses DART. The Parker Road station charged for parking for non-member city residents from April 2, 2012, to April 3, 2014, as a part of the Fair Share Parking initiative. Two DART park-and-ride bus facilities, separate from the rail lines, are in Plano: Jack Hatchell Transit Center and Northwest Plano Park & Ride.

Plano was the first city in Collin County to adopt a master plan for its road system. Plano is served directly by several major roadways and freeways. Central Plano is bordered to the east by U.S. Highway 75, the west by Dallas North Tollway, the south by President George Bush Turnpike (Texas State Highway 190 (east of Coit Road)), and the north by Sam Rayburn Tollway (Texas State Highway 121). Preston Road (Texas State Highway 289) is a major thoroughfare that runs through the city. Plano is Texas's largest city without an interstate highway.

Plano opened a new interchange at Parker Rd. and U.S. 75 in December 2010. The single-point interchange is the first of its kind in Texas. The design is intended to reduce severe congestion at this interchange. According to reports, traffic congestion has been reduced by 50-75%.

Plano is roughly 30 miles northeast of Dallas/Fort Worth International Airport, the primary airport serving Plano residents and visitors.

Fire department
The Plano Fire-Rescue has 386 full-time firefighters who operate out of 13 stations.

Police
The Plano Police Department is an accredited agency and Plano's principal law enforcement agency. The department is led by Chief Ed Drain. The department has authorized staff of 414 sworn officers, 178 full-time civilian employees, and 79 civilian part-time employees. It is a member of the North Texas Crime Commission and uses the Crime Stoppers program.

Water
Plano is part of the North Texas Municipal Water District, headquartered in Wylie, Texas. Lake Lavon is the district's principal source of raw water. Plano's water distribution system includes:
 10 elevated towers
 12 ground storage tanks
 54.5 million-gallon water storage capacity
 5 pump stations
 225 million-gallon daily pumping capacity
 1,080 miles of water mains
 65,965 metered service connections

Notable people

 Kellyn Acosta, soccer player
 Kristin Adams, actress and American Idol contestant
 Jeran Akers, politician
 Anousheh Ansari, engineer and co-founder and chairwoman of Prodea Systems
 Bryn Apprill, voice actress affiliated with Funimation
 Lance Armstrong, former professional cyclist
 Jake Arrieta, Cy Young Award-winning baseball pitcher, Plano East alumnus
 Aaron Aryanpur, stand-up comedian
 Laura Bailey, voice actress
 Alyssa Baumann, gymnast
 Andrew Beal, founder and chairman of Beal Bank
 Justin Blalock, NFL player
 Spencer Boldman, actor
 Corben Bone, soccer player
 Matt Borne, professional wrestler
 Lauri Bonacorsi, ice dancer
 Kyle Bosworth, NFL player
 Edward Boyden, neuroscientist
 Christopher "Big Black" Boykin, TV host
 Charlie Bradshaw, NFL player
 Cody Bragg, former soccer defender
 Jake Brendel, NFL player
 Rebecca Bross, gymnast
 Bob Bruce, former professional baseball pitcher
 James Buescher, former professional stock car racing driver
 Rex Burkhead, NFL player
 Carl Bussey, soccer player
 Marion Campbell, NFL player and head coach
 Danny Cater, former professional baseball player
 Caesar Cervin, soccer forward and coach
 Eve Chalom, a former competitive ice dancer who trained in Plano in the 1990s
 Andrew Chandler, actor
 Karen Chau, artist, showrunner, and Disney executive
 Jay Chern, director
 Arden Cho, actress
 T. J. Cline, American-Israeli basketball player
 Blake Coleman, hockey player
 Comer Cottrell, founder, Pro-Line Corp.
 Fred Couples, professional golfer, formerly lived in Plano
 Chace Crawford, actor
 Tyler Davis, basketball player
 Christopher Dean, retired ice dancer who coached in Plano in the 1990s
 Chad Deering, former soccer player
 Rob Dickerman, spinal surgeon
 Robert Dodd, former professional baseball pitcher
 Kenton Duty, actor
 Phil Dyer, politician
 Arlo Eisenberg, street skating pioneer
 Pat Evans, politician
 Tyler Ewing, composer
 Connor Fields, professional BMX racer
 Keith Flowers, football player
 Karith Foster, comedian
 Alyson Fox, illustrator
 Ben Fricke, NFL player
 Kirsten Frisch, ice dancer
 Anson Funderburgh, blues guitarplayer and bandleader of Anson Funderburgh and the Rockets
 Nick Garcia, soccer player
 Mathew Gates, ice dancer who trained in Plano in the 1990s
 John Georgelas, jihadist
 Gene Gibson, basketball coach
 Mónica González, soccer player
 Amber Glenn, figure skater
 Jack Graham, pastor of Prestonwood Baptist Church
 C. H. Greenblatt, TV writer
 Bob Guccione, publisher of Penthouse Kerri Hanks, soccer forward
 Cody Hanson, musician and songwriter
 Dick Haugland, biomedical researcher
 Brad Hawkins, actor, country singer and martial artist
 Sara Payne Hayden, female test pilot
 Fred E. Haynes Jr., Marine Corps general
 Marques Haynes, former professional basketball player
 Mark "Haz" Hazinski, professional table tennis athlete
 Lorraine Heath, author
 George H. Heilmeier, inventor of liquid crystal displays
 John Herrington, retired astronaut
 John Benjamin Hickey, actor
 Sam Honaker, NFL player and consul general to Turkey
 Elise Hu, broadcast journalist who hosts the TED Talks Daily podcast
 Rashad Hussain, associate White House Counsel and diplomat
 Michael Irvin, NFL player
 Casey James, singer and American Idol contestant
 Stephen H. Jecko, Episcopal bishop
 Sam Johnson, former U.S. representative and P.O.W. cellmate of John McCain
 Tania Joya, former jihadist
 Hunter Jumper, soccer player
 Stephen Katz, TV screenwriter
 Marklen Kennedy, actor
 Gerald Ketchum, Antarctic explorer
 Jimmy King, NBA player and former Michigan Fab Five member
 Madison Kocian, gymnast
 Harry LaRosiliere, politician
 Muhammed Lawal, MMA fighter, professional wrestler, NCAA wrestler and coach
 Jeff Leach, politician
 John Leake, NFL player
 Brad Leland, actor
 Ruifeng Li, chess grandmaster
 Will Licon, American Record-holder in the 200-yard breaststroke
 Per Lindstrand, aeronautical engineer, pilot, adventurer and entrepreneur who set a new world altitude record for hot-air balloons on June 6, 1988, ascending from Plano
 Nastia Liukin, gymnast
 Valeri Liukin, gymnastics coach
 John S. Loisel, World War II fighter ace
 Bronko Lubich, wrestler
 D'Anton Lynn, former American football cornerback
 Merlyn Mantle, author and widow of Mickey Mantle
 Yevgeny Marchenko, gymnastics coach
 Warren Maxwell, ice dancer who coached in Plano in the 1990s
 Harold Mayo, former football coach
 Kevin McCarthy, radio broadcaster
 Molly McClure, actress
 Glenn McCuen, actor and gymnast
 Kenny McEntyre, football player
 Kevin McHale, actor and singer
 Billy McKinney, Major League Baseball outfielder
 Scott Mechlowicz, actor
 Doug Mellard, stand-up comedian
 Adam Miller, professional baseball pitcher
 Robert J. Morris, founder of the now-defunct University of Plano
 Asif Mujtaba, cricketer and founder of the Dallas Youth Cricket League
 Kevin Murphy, football player
 William Murrah, professional football player
 Takudzwa Ngwenya, rugby player
 Cody Nickson, TV personality
 Otho Nitcholas, baseball pitcher and first city chief of police
 Stefan Noesen, NHL player
 Joseph Noteboom, football player
 Katelyn Ohashi, gymnast
 Toben Opurum, football player
 Hunter Parrish, actor
 Keaton Parks, soccer player
 James Parrish, football player
 Candice Patton, actress
 Drew Pearson, football player
 Charlie Peprah, NFL player
 Ross Perot, founder, Perot Systems
 Christopher Pettiet, actor
 Billy Phillips, former U.S. soccer goalkeeper
 Paige Pierce, professional disc golfer, five-time PDGA World Champion
 Patrice Pike, singer
 Jordan Pugh, football player
 Penny Ramsey, contestant on Survivor: Thailand
 Julius Randle, NBA player
 John Henry Rasor, pioneer, cotton farmer, and namesake of many Plano locations
 Greg Ray, IndyCar Series driver
 Alex Reid, singer
 Alan Reuber, football player
 Stephen Rippy, composer
 Keenan Robinson, football player
 Devorah Rose, editor-in-chief of Social Life'' magazine, television personality, and entrepreneur
 Cameron Rupp, professional baseball catcher
 Rusty Russell, football coach
 Chris Sampson, professional baseball pitcher
 Boz Scaggs, musician
 Bill Sefton, pole vaulter
 Meenakshi Seshadri, Bollywood actress
 Matt Shaheen, Republican member of Texas House of Representatives from Plano; former Collin County precinct commissioner
 Howie Shannon, basketball player and coach
 Florence Shapiro, Republican member of Texas Senate, known for sponsoring "Ashley's Laws"
 Charlie Shepard, Canadian football player
 Joseph W. Shepard, pioneer, horse and mule breeder, and namesake of many Plano locations
 Abby Smith, soccer player
 Billy Ray Smith Jr., NFL player
 Brian J. Smith, actor
 Lyon Sprague de Camp, fantasy writer
 Barbara Staff, co-chair of Ronald Reagan's 1976 Texas presidential primary campaign
 Russell A. Steindam, Medal of Honor recipient
 Jonathan Stickland, member of Texas House of Representatives from Tarrant County; born in Plano in 1983
 Tyson Sullivan, actor
 Jordan Tata, professional baseball pitcher
 Terry Tausch, football player
 Van Taylor, Republican state senator from Plano; former state representative; Iraq War officer
 George Teague, football player
 Pat Thomas, football player
 T.J. Thyne, actor
 Austin Bennett Tice, journalist kidnapped while reporting in Syria
 Travis Tope, actor
 Alan Tudyk, actor
 Mark Tuinei, football player
 Michael Urie, actor
 Grant Van De Casteele, soccer player
 Vickiel Vaughn, football player
 Chris Valletta, co-founder of Mission, a consumer products company, and a contestant on The Apprentice
 Michael Viscardi, mathematician
 Terrence Wheatley, football player
 G. Clifton Wisler, historical novelist
 Dudley Wysong, professional golfer
 Jeffery Xiong, chess grandmaster
 Zig Ziglar, motivational speaker, businessman

Sister cities

Plano's sister cities are:
  Hsinchu, Taiwan (2003)
  San Pedro Garza García, Mexico (1995)

Brampton, Canada, was also a sister city to Plano until 2018.

Notes

References

Bibliography

External links

 
 Plano Economic Development
 

 
Cities in Collin County, Texas
Cities in Denton County, Texas
Cities in Texas
Dallas–Fort Worth metroplex
1873 establishments in Texas
Populated places established in 1873